Qalağan, also known as Qalaqan or Kalagan, is a village and municipality in the Khachmaz Rayon of Azerbaijan.  It has a population of 977.  The municipality consists of the villages of Qalağan, Keymərəz, and Hacılar.

References 

Populated places in Khachmaz District